The Gala Lads is a barbershop quartet that won the 1962 SPEBSQSA international competition.

Discography 
 From The Top In Barbershop – You've Never Heard It So Good (1964; LP)

References 

Barbershop quartets
Barbershop Harmony Society